Ahmad Haziq bin Ahmad Puad (born 26 May 1993) is a Malaysian footballer who plays as a centre-back or wing-back for Malaysia Super League club Perak.

Club career

Kelantan
On 22 May 2018, Haziq signed a six-month contract with Malaysia Super League side Kelantan.

Career statistics

Club

References

External links
 

1993 births
Living people
Sime Darby F.C. players
UiTM FC players
MOF F.C. players
Kuantan FA players
Kelantan FA players
Malaysian footballers
Malaysian people of Malay descent
Association football defenders
People from Kedah
People from Alor Setar
Malaysia Super League players